GO Sharing is a micromobility company based in Nieuwegein, the Netherlands. Founded in September 2019 GO Sharing operates shared electric cars, electric bicycles and electric scooters in 36 cities in Europe.

History
In April 2021 GO Sharing raised $60 million in funding to expand its operations.

In May 2021, the Saarland-based provider TRIBe was acquired and operations in Saarbrücken transferred to the GO Sharing brand. For the end of May 2022, it was announced that operations in Saarbrücken and consequently Germany will be discontinued.

References

Transport companies established in 2019
Dutch companies established in 2019
Ridesharing companies